Guillermo Mendizábal Sánchez (born 8 October 1954) is a Mexican former footballer and manager.

Club career
He debuted with Cruz Azul in the 1974–75 season, and helped the team win the 1978–79 and 1979-80 league titles.

In his professional day view he played as a central defender substituting Alberto Quintano, later on 
Raúl Cardenás placed him as a central defensive midfielder where he played the rest of his career.

While playing for Cruz Azul, Atlético Madrid board of directors became interested in Mendizábal, but could not buy his transfer because Cruz Azul owned the players card. In his place Hugo Sánchez was enrolled with the colchonero side.

After Cruz Azul, he played for Universidad Autónoma de Guadalajara, from 1983 to 1985. Later on he played a full season with Rayo Vallecano of Spain, before returning to Mexico to play for Club Deportivo Guadalajara, where he won the 1986-87 league title. In that final Guadalajara and Cruz Azul faced each in other in the final with anecdotal emphasis because while Guillermo Mendizabal was playing for Chivas, his brother Marco Antonio was playing for the celestes. In that year whichever team was going to win the title they were going to have Mendizabal in the champion's team.

During his footballer career he played for Cruz Azul, UAG, Rayo Vallecano, and Club Deportivo Guadalajara.

Guillermo retired at the age of 37 in 1991.

International career 
With the Mexico national team he debuted 15 February 1978. In total, he played 24 games and scored 3 goals. He played the 1978 World Cup.

|-
| 1. || April 4, 1978 || Estadio Jalisco, Guadalajara, Mexico ||  || 2–0 || 3–0 || Friendly
|-
| 2. || April 15, 1980 || Estadio Mateo Flores, Guatemala City, Guatemala ||  || 3–2 || 4–2 || Friendly 
|-
| 3. || November 9, 1980 || Estadio Azteca, Mexico City, Mexico ||  || 3–0 || 5–1 || 1982 FIFA World Cup qualification 
|}

As a manager 
After hanging his boots, he began his managing career in 1995, at León AC where he only last the 1995–96 season.  He would also manage Correcaminos de la UAT in the Primera División A in 2003.

Nickname 
At the time he was playing for Cruz Azul his teammates would call him "Mendi" (to shorten his last name) and the "M" was changed to a "W" and since then his being known as "Wendy".

References

External links
 
 

1954 births
Living people
Footballers from Mexico City
Mexican expatriate footballers
Mexican footballers
La Liga players
Liga MX players
Cruz Azul footballers
Rayo Vallecano players
C.D. Guadalajara footballers
1978 FIFA World Cup players
Mexico international footballers
Mexican people of Basque descent
Association football midfielders
Expatriate footballers in Spain
Mexican expatriate sportspeople in Spain
Club León managers
Mexican football managers